This is a list of airports in Benin, sorted by location.

Benin, officially the Republic of Benin, is a country in West Africa. It borders Togo to the west, Nigeria to the east and Burkina Faso and Niger to the north; its short coastline to the south leads to the Bight of Benin. 



Airports 

Airport names shown in bold indicate the airport has scheduled service on commercial airlines.

See also 

 Transport in Benin
 List of airports by ICAO code: D#DB - Benin
 Wikipedia: WikiProject Aviation/Airline destination lists: Africa#Benin

References 
 
  - includes IATA codes
 Great Circle Mapper: Airports in Benin - IATA and ICAO codes, coordinates
 Airport records for Benin at Landings.com. Retrieved 2013-08-09

 
Airports
Benin
Airports
Benin